Chaparral Lake is located in Chaparral Park in west Scottsdale, Arizona, United States, at the northeast corner of Hayden and Chaparral Roads. It was the location of Balloon 2 in the 2009 DARPA Network Challenge.

Fish species
 Rainbow trout
 Largemouth bass
 Sunfish
 Catfish (channel)
 Catfish (flathead)
 Tilapia
 Carp

References

External links
 Video of Chaparral Lake
 http://www.azgfd.gov/h_f/stocking_schedule.shtml

Reservoirs in Maricopa County, Arizona
Parks in Arizona
Geography of Scottsdale, Arizona
Parks in Maricopa County, Arizona
Tourist attractions in Scottsdale, Arizona